Qaleh-ye Torkan (also Romanized as Qal‘eh-ye Torkān) is a village in Qahab-e Jonubi Rural District, in the Central District of Isfahan County, Isfahan Province, Iran. At the 2006 census, its population was 151, in 30 families.

References 

Populated places in Isfahan County